James H. Slater (1826–1899) was a U.S. Senator from Oregon from 1879 to 1885. Senator Slater may also refer to:

Fred J. Slater (1885–1943), New York State Senate
George A. Slater (1867–1937), New York State Senate
Samuel S. Slater (1870–1916), New York State Senate
Tom Slater (politician) (born 1945), Iowa State Senate